The Hundred of Colton is a cadastral unit of hundred in the County of Musgrave, South Australia on the Eyre Peninsula. The hundred was named after John Colton, a former member of the South Australian Parliament.

References

Colton
Colton